Leptopyrum is a monotypic genus of flowering plants belonging to the family Ranunculaceae. The only species is Leptopyrum fumarioides.

Its native range is Temperate Asia.

References

Ranunculaceae
Ranunculaceae genera
Monotypic Ranunculales genera